Jan Beneš (born 29 September 1987 in Jilemnice, Czechoslovakia) is a Czech orienteering competitor and double junior world champion.

He became Junior World Champion in the middle distance in Druskininkai in 2006 (shared with Sören Bobach), and with the Czech team in relay in Dubbo in 2007, together with Štěpán Kodeda and Adam Chromý.

See also
 Czech orienteers
 List of orienteers
 List of orienteering events

References

External links
 

1987 births
Living people
Czech orienteers
Male orienteers
Foot orienteers
People from Jilemnice
Sportspeople from the Liberec Region
Junior World Orienteering Championships medalists